Baden-Württemberg 1 (BW1) was a proposed lunar mission spacecraft. The mission was led by the University of Stuttgart. The basic design was for a cubical spacecraft 1 meter on a side, with a mass of about 200 kg (441 lb). It may use an electric propulsion system utilizing polytetrafluoroethylene PTFE.  work on trajectories had been performed.

Baden-Württemberg 1 was part of the Stuttgart Small Satellite Program initiated in 2002 that included FLYING LAPTOP, PERSEUS, CERMIT, and the aforementioned BW-1.

References

Further reading
Lichtbogenantriebe für Weltraumaufgaben (Arcjet propulsion systems for space applications), Prof. Monika Auweter-Kurtz, B.G. Teubner Stuttgart 1992 Institute of Space Systems at the University of Stuttgart

Space programme of Germany
Cancelled space probes
Missions to the Moon
Baden-Württemberg